Danica Radenković (born 9 October 1992 in Niš) is a Serbia women's national volleyball team player. She is setter for Casalmaggiore.

Career 
Danica Radenković's professional career began in the 2007-08 season, when she made her debut in the Serbian Superliga with the TENT of Obrenovac, where she played for two years; in 2009 with the Under-18 selection he won the silver medal at the European championship and the world championship, a tournament in which he was also awarded as the best dribbler.

In the 2009-10 championship she played for Klek Srbijašume, while in the following championship she landed for two years at Spartak Subotica; after having been part of the Serbian Under-19 selection in 2010, winning silver at the European championship, in which she receives the prize of best dribbler.

In the 2012-13 season she was hired for the first time abroad, playing for the River of Piacenza, a club involved in the Italian A1 Series with which she won both the Scudetto and the Italian Cup ; since 2012 she has also received the first call-ups in the senior national team. In the following season she played instead in the 1. German Bundesliga with Schweriner.

In the 2014-15 championship she arrived in Poland, where she took part in the Liga Siatkówki Kobiet with Muszyna, and then passed to the Atom Trefl Sopot in the following championship . In the 2016-17 season she moved to Azerbaijan, defending the 'Color Azerraill of Baku, while in the next year she returned to Muszyna . Shee then returned to the top Italian championship in the 2018-19 season, when she was hired by Casalmaggiore .

Awards 

 Italian Championship : 1

 2012-13

 Italian Cup : 1

 2012-13

National 

2009 European Under-18 Championship
 2009 Under-18 World Championship
 2010 European Under-19 Championship

Individual awards 

 2009 - Under-18 World Championship : Best setter
 2010 - European Under-19 Championship : Best setter
 2017 - Supe liga : Best setter

See also

Atom Trefl Sopot
2009 FIVB Volleyball Girls' U18 World Championship

Sources 
 Giocatrice – Lega Pallavolo Serie A Femminile
 Danica Radenkovic - Sezon 2017/2018 - Zawodniczki - Liga Siatkówki Kobiet
 CEV - Confédération Européenne de Volleyball
 Image at FIVB.org

External links
 
 

1992 births
Living people
Serbian women's volleyball players